Colleen Ann O'Shaughnessey (born September 15, 1971) is an American voice actress. She is best known as the voice of Sora Takenouchi in the Digimon anime, Jazz Fenton in Danny Phantom, Wasp in The Avengers: Earth's Mightiest Heroes, and Ino Yamanaka and Konohamaru Sarutobi in the Naruto anime. Since 2014, O'Shaughnessey has been the voice of Miles "Tails" Prower in the Sonic the Hedgehog franchise, a role she reprised in its first two live-action film adaptations.

Early life
O'Shaughnessey was born on September 15, 1971  in Grand Rapids, Michigan and she earned a B.F.A. degree in musical theatre from the University of Michigan.

Career
She is perhaps best known for her roles as Sora Takenouchi from the first and second seasons of Digimon (her first major voiceover role), Jazz Fenton in Danny Phantom, Ino Yamanaka and Konohamaru Sarutobi in Naruto, Nelliel Tu Odelschwanck in Bleach, and Janet Van Dyne/Wasp in The Avengers: Earth's Mightiest Heroes.

She has also worked in the video game industry, where she voiced Genis Sage in Tales of Symphonia and KOS-MOS in Xenosaga Episode II: Jenseits von Gut und Böse.  Since 2010 and 2014 respectively, she has been the voice of Charmy Bee and Miles "Tails" Prower in the Sonic the Hedgehog series.

She reprised her role of Sora Takenouchi for the Digimon Adventure tri movie series.

Personal life
As of 2018, she resides in Los Angeles, California with her husband, Jason Villard, and her two children; son Connor (b. 2001) and daughter Maggie (b. 2004).

Filmography

Anime

 B-Daman CrossFire – Sumi Inaba 
 Battle B-Daman – Assado
 Black Jack – Karen Aramis 
 Bleach – Hinako Shijō, Nelliel Tu Odelschwanck, Loly Aivirrne,  Michiru Ogawa, Yuichi Shibata, Kyoko Haida
 Blue Exorcist – Cram School Girl C (Ep. 7); Ghost Boy (Ep. 12)
 Boruto: Naruto Next Generations – Chocho Akimichi, Hanabi Hyūga, Ino Yamanaka
 Bungou Stray Dogs – Margaret Mitchell
 Digimon Adventure – Sora Takenouchi
 Digimon Adventure 02 – Sora Takenouchi
 Digimon Data Squad – Yoshino "Yoshi" Fujieda
 Digimon Fusion – Angie Hinomoto, Monitamon
 Dinozaurs (2000) – Kira (Ep.16)
 Drifting Dragons – Vanabelle
 Duel Masters – Mimi Tasogare  (Seasons 2 & 3 only)
 Glitter Force – Kelsey/Glitter Sunny, Shadow Sunny (Episode 38) 
 Initial D First Stage – Saori (Ep. 12 & 13, Tokyopop Dub)
 K – Anna Kushina, Sakura Asama, Claudia Weissman
 Kekkaishi – Yurina Kanda, Yomi Kasuga
 Mars Daybreak – Enora Taft
 Marvel Future Avengers – F.R.I.D.A.Y., Black Mamba
 Mirage of Blaze – Saori 
 Mobile Suit Gundam: The Origin – Artesia Som Deikun/Sayla Mass 
 Mobile Suit Gundam Unicorn – Additional Voices
 Monster – Wim Knaup
 My Next Life as a Villainess: All Routes Lead to Doom! – Mary Hunt
 Naruto – Ino Yamanaka, Konohamaru Sarutobi
 Naruto: Shippuden – Ino Yamanaka, Konohamaru Sarutobi, Hanabi Hyuga (Ep. 166), Kaori, Furofuki (Ep. 186)
 Nier: Automata Ver1.1a – Commander
 Nodame Cantabile – Kiyora Miki
 Overman King Gainer – Sara Kodama
 Sailor Moon – Thetis (Ep. 12, Viz dub), Mie Sayama (Ep. 52, Viz dub), U-Ndoukai (Ep. 117, Viz dub)
 Slayers Revolution – Pokota
 Slayers Evolution–R – Pokota
 Somali and the Forest Spirit – Praline
 Stitch! – Kijimuna 
 Sword Art Online II – Endou, Verdandi (Ep. 17)
 Tenkai Knights – Ms. Finwick, Additional Voices
 The Orbital Children – Hiroshi Tanegashima
 Tokyo Pig – Dizzie Lizzie
 Vampire Knight series – Seiren, Additional Voices
 Vandread – Seiron 
 Zatch Bell! – Suzy Mizuno, Robnos

Animation
 The Adventures of Kid Danger (2018) – Menu Board
 The Avengers: Earth's Mightiest Heroes (2010–2012) – Wasp, Vapor, Valkyrie, Cassandra Lang, Female Kang
 Bubble Everfreeies – Saphie 
 Danny Phantom – Jazz Fenton, Mikey, Flight Attendant, Girl 1, Girl 3, Girl, Alarm Voice, Spandex-Wearing Student, Nerd Girl (1), Walla 2, Vid, Additional Voices
 Doc McStuffins – Pickles, Agnes Mom, Townsperson
 Freedom Fighters: The Ray – Mrs. Terrill 
 Hanazuki: Full of Treasures – Little Dreamer, Red Hemka, Yellow Hemka
 Important Things with Demetri Martin – Female Bystander
 Jonah Hex: Motion Comics – Additional Voices
 The Kids from Room 402 – Polly, Mary–Ellen, Don
 Lego Scooby–Doo: Knight Time Terror – Wanda
 The Life and Times of Juniper Lee – Jody Irwin, Rachel Irwin, Hammerette #3, Mrs. Fallon, Mrs. Irwin, Slim, Teen #2, Attendant, Mall Manager #1, Cleota, Intercom, Citizen, Astronaut, Margie, Marvin, Photographer, Co-Worker #2, Additional Voices
 OK K.O.! Let's Be Heroes – Tails ("Let’s Meet Sonic")
 Pinkfong Wonderstar – Pinkfong
 Random! Cartoons – Tiffany, Mom, Kit, Some Kid, Little Girl
 The Replacements – The Lise, Swifty
 Sonic Boom – Tails
 Special Agent Oso – Jake's Mom ("License To Clean"), Jade's Mom ("On Her Cousin's Special Salad"), Nadia's Mom ("For Sleepy Eyes Only")
 Static Shock – Nightingale/Gail
 What's New, Scooby-Doo? – Celia Clyde, Jingle, Galana's Friends 
 The Fixies – Simka, Mom Lyubov and Ygrek
 What's with Andy? – Lori Mackney (2001–2002)

Film
 Axel: The Biggest Little Hero (2013) – Jono
 Bleach: Memories of Nobody (2006) – Store Keeper
 Boruto: Naruto the Movie (2015) – Ino Yamanaka
 Cars (2006) – M.A. Brake Drumm
 Digimon Adventure 02: Revenge of Diaboromon – Sora Takenouchi
 Digimon: The Movie – Sora Takenouchi, Male Student ("Four Years Later" segment)
 Digimon Adventure tri. – Sora Takenouchi, Mrs. Mochizuki, Tapirmon
 Digimon Adventure: Last Evolution Kizuna – Sora Takenouchi
 The Fixies: Top Secret – Simka and Mom Lyubov
 Horton Hears a Who! (2008) – Angela, Additional Voices
 The Last: Naruto the Movie – Hanabi Hyuga, Ino Yamanaka, Konohamaru Sarutobi
 Monsters University – Additional Voices
 Naruto Shippuden the Movie: The Will of Fire – Ino Yamanaka
 The Orbital Children – Hiroshi Tanegashima
 The Painting – Harlequin
 Okko's Inn – Suzuki
 Party Central – Mom
 Patema Inverted – Additional Voices
 Ponyo – Karen, Additional Voices
 Road to Ninja: Naruto the Movie – Ino Yamanaka
 Sailor Moon Super S: The Movie – Perle / Sailor Moon Super S Plus: Ami's First Love – Bonnon
 Sonic the Hedgehog (2020) – Tails
 Sonic the Hedgehog 2 (2022) – Tails
 Spirited Away – Additional Voices
 Toy Story 3 (2010) – Additional Voices
 Violet Evergarden: Eternity and the Auto Memory Doll – Isabella York
 Violet Evergarden: The Movie – Additional Cast
 Winx Club: The Mystery of the Abyss (2014) – Omnia

Video games

 Alpha Protocol – Madison Saint James
 Bleach series – Nelliel Tu Odelschwanck
 Cookie Run: Kingdom – Pastry Cookie, Tails Cookie
 Digimon World Data Squad – Yoshino Fujieda, Runaway A, Runaway B
 Dirge of Cerberus: Final Fantasy VII – Incidental Characters
 Disney Infinity: Marvel Super Heroes – Wasp
 Disney Infinity 3.0 – Additional Voices
 Disney Princess: Palace Pets – Summer
 EverQuest II – Emissary Millia, redeemable traitor (human), Alanaramal Zaste, Freya Ora, Maida Tudors, Bartender, Innkeeper Female Good & Evil recording1 (Kerran), Raban, Yanari Cyellan, Nyla Diggs
 Fallout 4 – Sylvia Cooper
 Final Fantasy VII Remake – Additional Voices
 Final Fantasy XIII – Additional Voices
 Final Fantasy XIII-2 – Additional Voices
 Fire Emblem: Three Houses – Kronya, Monica von Ochs
 Fire Emblem Warriors: Three Hopes – Kronya, Monica von Ochs
 Fire Emblem Engage – Jean
 Guild Wars 2 – Female Asura Player Character
 Hearthstone – Additional Voices
 Hitman – Valerie St. Clair, Additional Voices
 La Pucelle: Tactics – Alouette
 Lego Dimensions – Miles "Tails" Prower
 Lightning Returns: Final Fantasy XIII – Additional Voices
 Lost Judgment – Kuniko
 Marvel Heroes – Julia Carpenter/Arachne, Wasp/Janet Van Dyne
 Metal Gear Solid 4: Guns of the Patriots – Soldiers
 Naruto series – Ino Yamanaka, Konohamaru, Tsunami, Hanabi Hyuga
 Psychonauts – Nils Lutefisk and Crystal Flowers Snagrash
 Persona 5 Strikers – Akane Hasegawa
 Red Ninja: End of Honor – Additional voices
 Rogue Galaxy – Mark Pocacchio
 Shenmue III – Additional Cast
 Sonic the Hedgehog series – Miles "Tails" Prower (2014–present), Charmy Bee (2010–present)
 Boom (video games) – Tails
 Fire & Ice Rise of Lyric Shattered Crystal Sonic Dash 2 Colors – Charmy (Nintendo DS version only; credited as Maggie O'Connor)
 Generations – Charmy (Console/PC version only; credited as Maggie O'Connor)
 Forces – Tails, Charmy, Additional Voices
 Frontiers – Tails
 Mario & Sonic at the Rio 2016 Olympic Games – Tails
 Team Sonic Racing – Tails
 South Park: The Fractured but Whole – The New Kid’s Mom
 Spider-Man – Woman with missing purse on rooftop
 SpongeBob SquarePants featuring Nicktoons: Globs of Doom – Jazz Fenton
 Star Wars: The Old Republic – Additional Voices
 Tales of Symphonia – Genis Sage
 Tower of Fantasy – Huma
 Valkyria Chronicles – Alicia Melchiott
 Valkyria Chronicles II – Alicia Gunther
 WildStar – Drusera, Professor Goldbough, Yuria, Cassian Female, Aurine Female 
 Xenosaga Episode II: Jenseits von Gut und Böse – KOS-MOS
 Zatch Bell! Mamodo Fury – Suzy Mizuno, Robnos

Documentary
 Adventures in Voice Acting – Herself
 I Know That Voice – Herself

OtherThe Oogieloves in the Big Balloon Adventure Violetta'' – Camila vocals (English localization of Argentinian telenovela)

References

External links

Interview with Colleen O'Shaughnessey at the Digimon Encyclopedia

1971 births
People from Grand Rapids, Michigan
Living people
American video game actresses
American voice actresses
Place of birth missing (living people)
University of Michigan alumni
20th-century American actresses
21st-century American actresses